Klahowya Secondary School (or KSS) is a public secondary school located in Silverdale, Washington. It was established in 1997 as part of Central Kitsap School District. Klahowya Secondary School was constructed in 1996-1997 as a 133,715 square foot facility with 34 classrooms, 13 labs, a gym, auditorium, and library for grades 6-12.

History 
The school was named for the Chinook Jargon word "klahowya", which means "welcome". It was planned in the 1990s and opened in 1997. Originally scheduled to open in 1996, it was delayed for another year. Serving grades 6-12 (after 2016), it was the third high school in Central Kitsap School District. The first senior class graduated in 1999. In 2016, the school expanded to include sixth graders. Two years later, a new wing, auxilary gymnasium, 13 classrooms, three laboratories, a fitness room and a second music room were opened as part of a  addition. A new track and field stadium was also added. On March 13, 2020, Klahowya remained closed due to the on-going COVID-19 pandemic.

Incidents
On March 8, 2019, a bomb scare occurred when a student brought an object with the word "dynamite" labeled on it to the office causing a lockdown to happen. Deputies later confirmed the object was a remote control car battery the student found at a park and posed no danger.

On May 18, 2022, a lockdown occurred when a student was found in the parking lot with a handgun. The student was eventually arrested a short time later and the lockdown was lifted later that morning.

Demographics
In the 2021-2022 school year, 48.4% of the students at KSS were male, 50.8% were female, and 0.8% were Gender X. 0.1% were Native American, 1.0% were Asian, 0.2% were Native Hawaiian/Other Pacific Islander, 8.6% were Hispanic/Latino, 0.6% were Black/African American, 75.6% were White, and 13.9% were Two or More Races.

Atletics
Sport at KSS include:

Middle School 
Fall: Track, Fastpitch softball
Winter: Boys Basketball, Girls Soccer, Girls Basketball, Wrestling
Spring: Football, Volleyball, Cross Country

High School
Fall: Cross Country, Football, Girls Soccer, Girls Swimming, Boys Tennis, Volleyball
Winter: Boys Basketball, Girls Basketball, Bowling, Boys Swimming, Wrestling
Spring: Baseball, Fastpitch softball, Golf, Boys Soccer, Girls Tennis, Track & Field, Boys Lacrosse, Girls Lacrosse

Etymology
"Klahowya” is Chinook Jargon. It is pronounced "Kluh-HOW-yuh", meaning “welcome.”

References

External links
School's OSPI report card

High schools in Kitsap County, Washington
Educational institutions established in 1997
Public high schools in Washington (state)
Public middle schools in Washington (state)
1997 establishments in Washington (state)